Hamad Samy (born 1899, date of death unknown) was an Egyptian weightlifter. He competed at the 1920 Summer Olympics and the 1924 Summer Olympics.

References

External links
 

1899 births
Year of death missing
Egyptian male weightlifters
Olympic weightlifters of Egypt
Weightlifters at the 1920 Summer Olympics
Weightlifters at the 1924 Summer Olympics
Place of birth missing